Lepeta caeca, common name the northern blind limpet, is a species of sea snail, a true limpet, a marine gastropod mollusk in the family Lepetidae, one of the families of true limpets.

Distribution

Description 
The maximum recorded shell length is 18 mm.

Habitat 
Minimum recorded depth is 4 m. Maximum recorded depth is 1097 m.

References

External links

Lepetidae
Gastropods described in 1776
Taxa named by Otto Friedrich Müller